Gnaphosa mcheidzeae is a species of ground spiders found in Georgia.

See also 
 List of Gnaphosidae species

References

External links 

Gnaphosidae
Spiders of Europe
Spiders of Georgia (country)
Spiders described in 1998